All Tomorrows: A Billion Year Chronicle of the Myriad Species and Mixed Fortunes of Man is a 2006 work of science fiction and speculative evolution written and illustrated by the Turkish artist C. M. Kosemen under the pen name Nemo Ramjet. It explores a hypothetical future path of human evolution set from the near future to a billion years from the present. Several future human species evolve through natural means and through genetic engineering, conducted by both humans themselves and by a mysterious and superior alien species called the Qu.

Inspired by the science fiction works of Olaf Stapledon and Edward Gibbon's The History of the Decline and Fall of the Roman Empire, Kosemen worked on All Tomorrows from 2003 to the publication of the book as a free PDF file online in 2006. The book has never been physically published, but as per Kosemen himself "had a life of its own" on the internet. Kosemen intends to eventually publish All Tomorrows in physical form, with new text and updated illustrations.

Summary 
Following the colonization of Mars, a brief but catastrophic Interplanetary War takes place between Mars and Earth. After both planets make peace with each other, a large-scale colonization initiative is carried out by genetically-engineered humans called Star People throughout the galaxy.

Humans then encounter a malevolent and superior alien species called the Qu. The Qu's religion motivates them to remake the universe through genetic engineering. A short war follows in which humanity is defeated. The Qu bioengineer the surviving humans as punishment into a range of exotic forms, many of them unintelligent. They are left to evolve on their own as the Qu leave the galaxy. The bioengineered humans range from worm-like humans to insectivores and modular and cell-based species. The book follows the progress of these new humans as they either go extinct or regain sapience in wildly different forms and gradually discover that the Qu experimented on them.

One race, known as the Ruin Haunters, eventually replaces their bodies with mechanical forms, now to be known as the Gravital. The Gravital colonize the rest of the galaxy while annihilating most life within it, including the other post-human species. They are, themselves, destroyed by the Asteromorphs, the descendants of the human species who escaped experimentation by the Qu. The final chapters of the book detail humanity's rebound as a posthuman species, their first contact with another galaxy's life, rediscovering and defeating the Qu, and concluding with the rediscovery of Earth.

All Tomorrows ends with a picture of the alien author of the book, holding a billion-year-old human skull and writing that all posthuman species disappeared a billion years ago, for unknown reasons. The author goes on to state that mankind's story was always about the lives of humans themselves, not major wars and abstract ideals. The author ends by encouraging the reader to "Love Today, and seize All Tomorrows!"

Development 
Kosemen worked on All Tomorrows from 2003 to 2006. The work of Olaf Stapledon, particularly Last and First Men (1930) and Star Maker (1937), served as the main inspiration for the work, alongside Edward Gibbon's The History of the Decline and Fall of the Roman Empire.

All Tomorrows is written in the style of an historical work, narrated by an alien creature recounting the history of humanity. According to Kosemen, the "tone of voice is a high school student fanboying on the Decline and Fall of the Roman Empire by Edward Gibbon". The artwork is also reflective of this "archaeological" approach, with faded and textured visual effects applied to the paintings. The original reason for adding the faded tint to the paintings was Kosemen wanting to avoid the paintings looking like "horrible racist caricatures".

All Tomorrows has never been physically published. It was released for free online as a PDF on 4 October 2006 and has since then, per Kosemen himself, "had a life of its own as a PDF floating around the backwaters of the internet like a ghost ship". One of the common links which All Tomorrows has been shared through is a wiki site dedicated to speedrunning.

Reception and legacy 
Originally an obscure work, All Tomorrows slowly gained popularity online following its 2006 publication. In a 2021 podcast interview, Kosemen noted that the generation born right after him (Kosemen having been born in 1984) "really embraced" All Tomorrows, which he believes might partially be due to the "myriad disasters" that have happened in the world since then. The book has received some scholarly attention; in 2020, All Tomorrows was among the works discussed in Jörg Matthias Determann's book Islam, Science Fiction and Extraterrestrial Life, which explores astrobiology and science fiction in the Muslim world. Following the upload of an abridged version of the book's story by YouTuber Alt Shift X in June 2021 All Tomorrows saw a particular surge in popularity online during the summer of 2021. Among other things, there was a surge of internet memes based on the book, primarily on YouTube and Twitter as well as fan art based on the creatures in the book. 

Readers have characterized All Tomorrows as "bizarre", "inexplicable", "interesting" and "fascinating", and as a work incorporating body horror. Ivan Farkas of Cracked.com called All Tomorrows "existentially freak-ay" in 2021 and described the artwork as "otherwordly". A 2022 article by Andrea Viscusi on the Italian media website Stay Nerd compared All Tomorrows to Man After Man (1990) by Dougal Dixon, also a work tackling future human evolution, but found the depictions in All Tomorrows to be "even more disturbing", yet still possible on an "almost subliminal level" to "recognize as our fellow men". In a 2022 article in the lifestyle magazine A Little Bit Human, Allia Luzong considered All Tomorrows to be a "fun exploration of what could be" but also a serious work with serious themes, particularly noting how humanity's social ills are present throughout the narrative.

Kosemen stated in 2021 that though the book had grown popular, he had almost "disowned" All Tomorrows, finding parts of it "a bit cringey". When designing his website and including his different books and projects, Kosemen purposefully left out All Tomorrows. Following the summer of 2021, he has since added the book to his website and intends to eventually publish All Tomorrows in physical form with new text and illustrations. By 16 October 2022, Kosemen had written the expanded version up until the Qu's conquest of the galaxy. Kosemen stated that the material up until that point amounted to 200 pages, almost twice the length of the entire original book.

See also
Transhuman
Posthuman
Biopunk
All Yesterdays (2012) by John Conway, Darren Naish and Kosemen – a similarly titled book on paleoart, co-authored by Kosemen.
Man After Man (1990) by Dougal Dixon – a similar book about (human) speculative evolution.

References

External links 
All Tomorrows – original 2006 PDF version of the book
Все Грядущие дни – 2009/2010 Russian translation of All Tomorrows by Pavel Volkov
 – by Alt Shift X, recommended by C. M. Kosemen himself (see pinned comment)

2006 novels
2006 science fiction novels
Turkish science fiction novels
Human-derived fictional species
Books about evolution
Human evolution books
Speculative evolution
Novels set in the future
Novels about genetic engineering
Extinction in fiction
Fiction set in the 7th millennium or beyond